Frederick, Frederic or Fred Taylor may refer to:

Sports
 Fred Taylor (American football) (born 1976), former American professional football player and running back
 Fred Taylor (American football coach) (1920–2013), American college football coach at Texas Christian University
 Fred Taylor (Australian footballer) (1918–1991), Australian rules footballer for St Kilda
 Fred Taylor (sprinter) (born 1957), American former sprinter
 Fred Taylor (footballer, born 1877), English football player for Grimsby Town
 Fred Taylor (footballer, born 1884) (1884–1954), English football player for Chelsea
 Fred Taylor (footballer, born 1890) (1890–?), English football player for Hull City and Southampton
 Fred Taylor (basketball, born 1924) (1924–2002), American college basketball coach at The Ohio State University
 Fred Taylor (basketball, born 1948), American former NBA player
 Fred Taylor (cyclist) (1890–1968), American Olympic cyclist
 Freddy Taylor (1920–1983), English football player for Burnley and New Brighton
 Frederick Taylor, known as Cyclone Taylor (1884–1979), Canadian ice hockey forward
 Frederick Winslow Taylor (1856–1915), American engineer and management consultant (also a tennis champion and Olympian golfer)
 Fred Taylor (cricketer) (1891–1968), English cricketer
 Frederick Taylor (cricketer) (1916–1999), English cricketer

Other
 Frederick Taylor (colonist) (1810–1872), English colonial property manager, perpetrator of the Murdering Gully massacre
 Fred M. Taylor (1855–1932), American economist
 Fredrick Monroe Taylor (1901–1988), American attorney, federal judge in Idaho
 Frederick Winslow Taylor (1856–1915), American engineer and management consultant (also a tennis champion and Olympian golfer)
 Fred Taylor (Pennsylvania politician) (born 1931), Pennsylvania politician
 Frederick Taylor (historian) (born 1947), British historian
 Frederick Howard Taylor (1862–1946), British pioneer Protestant Christian missionary to China
 Frederick Southgate Taylor (1847–1896), American businessman, politician and founder of Pi Kappa Alpha fraternity
 Frederick W. Taylor (bishop) (1853–1903), bishop of the Episcopal Diocese of Quincy
 Fred Taylor (physicist), atmospheric physicist and planetary scientist, Halley Professor at Oxford University
 Fred Barney Taylor (born 1948), American independent filmmaker
 Sir Frederick Taylor, 1st Baronet, British physician

See also
 Frederick Taylor University, an institution in California, USA
 Frederick Taylor International University, a defunct unaccredited institution
 Frederick Williams-Taylor (1863–1945), Canadian banker